Peter Cecil Bull,  (21 March 1912 – 20 May 1984) was a British character actor who appeared in supporting roles in such films as The African Queen, Tom Jones, and Dr. Strangelove.

Biography 
He was the fourth and youngest son of William Bull, later Sir William Bull, 1st Baronet, Member of Parliament for Hammersmith.

Bull was educated at Winchester College. His first professional stage appearance was in If I Were You at the Shaftesbury Theatre in 1933.

He was a friend of Alec Guinness, whom he first met at  during training in the Second World War, and later ; he served as an officer in the Royal Naval Volunteer Reserve, later commanding Landing Craft (Flak) 16 in the Mediterranean. 
He achieved the rank of Lieutenant-Commander and was awarded the Distinguished Service Cross. Returning to acting after the war, he both narrated and had a small on-screen role in Scrooge (1951); and portrayed the captain of the ship that Katharine Hepburn's and Humphrey Bogart's characters set out to destroy, whom they persuade to marry them just before they are to be executed, in The African Queen (1951). Bull was the first actor to portray Pozzo in the English-language version of Samuel Beckett's Waiting For Godot when it opened on 3 August 1955.
  
Bull's performance as the Soviet Ambassador, Alexi de Sadesky, in Dr Strangelove (1964) is probably the best known of his many film and TV appearances. He was cast as Thwackum, one of Blifil's two tutors, in the 1963 film Tom Jones. (The other tutor, Square, of contrasting build and character, was played by John Moffatt.)

In the 1970s, he ran a small shop just off Notting Hill Gate, selling zodiac-related items.

Bull published a number of books on the subject of teddy bears, including Bear With Me, as well as a book on his adventures on the Greek islands of Corfu and Paxos, where he owned a house, It isn't all Greek to me, illustrated by Oscar winner Roger Furse. He was also the author of a non-fiction book about his experiences during the Second World War as commander of a Tank Landing Craft (LCT), To Sea in a Sieve and several memoirs and collections of his letters.

Peter Bull died of a heart attack in London on 20 May 1984 at 72 years of age.

Partial filmography

Published Works

To Sea in a Sieve (1956)
Bulls in the Meadow (1957)
I Know the Face But... (1959)
Not on Your Telly (1961) 
I Say Look Here (1965) 
It Isn't All Greek to Me (1967) 
Bear with me (1969) 
The Teddy Bear Book (1970) 
Life Is a Cucumber (1973) 
Peter Bull's Book of Teddy Bears (1977) 
A Hug of Teddy Bears (1984) 
Bull's Eyes: The Selected Memoirs of Peter Bull (1986)

Notes

External links
 
 
 Peter Bull at Find-A-Grave

1912 births
1984 deaths
Recipients of the Distinguished Service Cross (United Kingdom)
Royal Navy officers of World War II
English male film actors
Male actors from London
People educated at Winchester College
20th-century English male actors
Royal Naval Volunteer Reserve personnel of World War II
Younger sons of baronets